Chantal Cauquil is a French politician, who, from 1999 until 2004, was a Member of the European Parliament (MEP) representing France. She was elected as a joint candidate for the Revolutionary Communist League and Workers' Struggle.

References

1949 births
Living people
People from Montauban
Revolutionary Communist League (France) MEPs
Workers' Struggle MEPs
MEPs for France 1999–2004